Belkhir Belhaddad (born 9 July 1969) is a French entrepreneur and politician representing La République En Marche! (LREM) and Territories of Progress (TDP) who has been serving as a member of the French National Assembly since the 2017 elections, representing the department of Moselle.

Early life
Belhaddad was born in Algeria and moved to France when his parents settled there to work in the steel industry.

Political career
Having previously been active in the Socialist Party, Belhaddad joined LREM in 2016. In parliament, Belhaddad serves as member of the Committee on Social Affairs. In addition to his committee assignments, he is a member of the French-Algerian Parliamentary Friendship Group.

In July 2019, Belhaddad voted in favour of the French ratification of the European Union’s Comprehensive Economic and Trade Agreement (CETA) with Canada.

Other activities
 French Reserve Fund, Member of the Supervisory Board

See also
 2017 French legislative election

References

1969 births
Living people
People from Batna Province
Algerian emigrants to France
Socialist Party (France) politicians
La République En Marche! politicians
Territories of Progress politicians
Deputies of the 15th National Assembly of the French Fifth Republic
Deputies of the 16th National Assembly of the French Fifth Republic
Members of Parliament for Moselle